Mark E. Kingdon is a hedge fund manager and president of Kingdon Capital Management, a US investment management company with $1B in assets under management.

Biography 
Kingdon was born in Brooklyn and grew up on Long Island. He graduated from Columbia College in 1971 and Harvard Business School in 1973. Kingdon began his career with AT&T as a pension fund administrator from 1973 to 1975. In 1975, he joined Century Capital Associates, where he remained for eight years. In 1983, he founded Kingdon Capital management with $2 million that grew into a $5.9 billion hedge fund as of 2007 and was listed among Financial Times''' "100 hedge funds to watch."Between 1983 and 2000, his fund has maintained a compounded annual return of 22.99 percent.

Kingdon is a Trustee Emeritus, a member of the board of Investment Management Company, co-chair of the Global Leadership Council and a member of the President’s Council on World Projects at Columbia University.

Kingdon also served on the Columbia College Board of Visitors as well as the Board of Trustees of Columbia University.

 Philanthropy 
Some of Kingdon's philanthropic endeavors include donating funds to groups that help to support impoverished children such as Harlem Children's Zone and groups that help promote Chinese culture such as the China Institute. He endowed the C. Lowell Harriss Professorship of Economics at Columbia University in honor of his mentor, and the position is currently being held by economist and vice chairman of the Federal Reserve, Richard Clarida. He also served as a trustee of Carnegie Hall. Kingdon currently sits on the boards of Harlem Children's Zone, the New York City Police Foundation and New York City Center and is a member of the Dean’s Advisory Board of Harvard Business School.  

 Awards 
In 2003, Kingdon received the Institutional Investor/Alternative Investment News'' Lifetime Achievement Award. In 2005, Kingdon received Columbia College's John Jay Award for distinguished professional achievement as well as the Alexander Hamilton Award, the highest honor that Columbia College bestows upon its alumni.

Personal life and family 
Kingdon is married to Anla Cheng, a senior partner of private equity firm Sino-Century who also founded the New York-based news platform, SupChina. Cheng was also a senior investment banker with Robert Fleming & Co. She sits on the Committee of 100 and is a trustee of Columbia Global Centers, East Asia. Cheng is now under investigation by the US Senate concerning her Sup China (now renamed ‘The China Project’) business being a home for Chinese Communist Party Agents. Investigations are continuing as of late 2022. His daughter, Jessica Kingdon, is an Academy Award-nominated director and producer known for her 2021 documentary, Ascension.

References

Further reading 

American financiers
American financial analysts
American hedge fund managers
American investors
American money managers
American stock traders
American philanthropists
Living people
Stock and commodity market managers
20th-century American businesspeople
Year of birth missing (living people)

Columbia College (New York) alumni
Harvard Business School alumni
People from Brooklyn